Max Stewart (born 16 July 1993) is a British judoka.

Judo career
Stewart became champion of Great Britain, winning the middleweight division at the British Judo Championships in 2016. The same year he won the gold medal at the 2016 Judo Grand Prix Qingdao in the -90 kg category.

References

External links
 

1993 births
Living people
British male judoka